Prosystenus is an extinct genus of fly in the family Dolichopodidae. It contains only one species, Prosystenus zherichini, from the Eocene of Sakhalin Island, Russia.

References

†
†
Prehistoric Diptera genera
†
Eocene insects